Kangaroo is a 1923 novel by D.H. Lawrence. It is set in Australia.

Description
Kangaroo is an account of a visit to New South Wales by an English writer named Richard Lovat Somers and his German wife Harriet in the early 1920s. This appears to be semi-autobiographical, based on a three-month visit to Australia by Lawrence and his wife Frieda, in 1922. The novel includes a chapter ("Nightmare") describing the Somers' experiences in wartime St Ives, Cornwall, vivid descriptions of the Australian landscape, and Richard Somers' sceptical reflections on fringe politics in Sydney. Ultimately, after being initially somewhat drawn to the Digger movement led by Benjamin Cooley - 'Kangaroo' - neither it nor the "great general emotion" of Kangaroo himself appeal to Somers, and in this the novel begins to reflect Lawrence's own experiences during World War I. On the other hand, Somers also rejects the socialism of Willie Struthers, which emphasises "generalised love".

Australian journalist Robert Darroch – in several articles in the late 1970s, and a 1981 book entitled D.H. Lawrence in Australia – claimed that Lawrence based Kangaroo on real people and events he witnessed in Australia. The extent to which this is true remains a matter of controversy. Joseph Davis in D.H. Lawrence at Thirroul (1989) is sympathetic to the view that Kangaroo may be based on real events, but argues that it is impossible that Lawrence had time to meet clandestine political leaders in Sydney when he was too busy writing his novel in Thirroul. Davis feels it is more likely to have been a local south-coast identity associated with Thirroul who would have provided some of the details of Lawrence's political plot. His 2022 book "D.H. Lawrence at Thirroul: One Hundred Years on..." encompasses an additional 35 years research on Lawrence's Australian stay and is available free on line.

Kangaroo is the fictional nickname of one of Lawrence's characters, Benjamin Cooley, a prominent ex-soldier and lawyer, who is also the leader of a secretive, fascist paramilitary organisation, the "Diggers Club". Cooley fascinates Somers, but he maintains his distance from the movement. It has been suggested by Darroch and others that Cooley was based on Major General Charles Rosenthal, a notable World War I leader and right-wing activist. It has been alleged that Rosenthal was involved with the Old Guard, a secret anti-communist militia.

Similarly, according to Darroch, the character of Jack Calcott – who is the Somers' neighbour in Sydney and introduces Richard Somers to Cooley – may have been based on a controversial Australian military figure, Major John Scott, who was both an associate of Rosenthal and an Old Guard official. Another central character is Willie Struthers, a left-wing activist reputed to have been based partly on Willem Siebenhaar, who made Lawrence's acquaintance in Western Australia. James Sharpe is said to have been based on the music critic and composer Cecil Gray.

Influence and adaptations
Kangaroo is sometimes cited as an influence on the Jindyworobak movement, an Australian nationalist literary group, which emerged about a decade later. Gideon Haigh saw fit to dub it "one of the sharpest fictional visions of the country and its people".

It was adapted as a film, also called Kangaroo, in 1987, featuring Colin Friels as Somers, Judy Davis as Harriet and Hugh Keays-Byrne as Kangaroo.

The Australian composer Peter Sculthorpe used extracts from the novel in his work for speaker and orchestra, The Fifth Continent (1963). It was recorded in 1963 by Fred Parslow, Melbourne Symphony Orchestra and Thomas Matthews, and then again in 1997 with the composer narrating, accompanied by Tasmanian Symphony Orchestra and David Porcelijn - released on ABC Classics.

Further reading
D.H. Lawrence, Kangaroo (1994; originally published 1923), edited by Bruce Steele, New York: Cambridge University Press. 
Robert Darroch, D.H. Lawrence in Australia (1981), South Melbourne: Macmillan Co. of Australia. 
Joseph Davis, ''D. H. Lawrence at Thirroul: One Hundred Years On...: https://www.academia.edu/.../D_H_LAWRENCE_AT_THIRROUL_ONE...

References

External links
 
 Digital facsimile at the Internet Archive

 [https://www.academia.edu/.../D_H_LAWRENCE_AT_THIRROUL_ONE...
1923 British novels
British novels adapted into films
English novels
Novels by D. H. Lawrence
Novels set in New South Wales
Martin Secker books